The Monaco Grand Prix is a Formula One motor race held on the streets of Monaco.

Monaco Grand Prix or Monaco GP can also refer to:
The Monaco Grand Prix Formula Three support race (see List of Monaco Grand Prix Formula Three support race winners)
Monaco GP (video game), released by Sega in 1979
Super Monaco GP, an arcade Formula One racing simulation, released by Sega in 1990
Ayrton Senna's Super Monaco GP II, sequel to Super Monaco GP, introduced in 1992
Monaco Grand Prix (video game), a motor racing game introduced in 1999 for the Nintendo 64